The 1964 Winter Olympics, officially known by the International Olympic Committee as the IX Olympic Winter Games, were a multi-sport event held in Innsbruck, Austria, from 29 January through 9 February 1964. A total of 1,095 athletes representing 36 National Olympic Committees (NOCs) participated in the Games in 34 events across 10 disciplines.

The Olympic program was adjusted from that of the 1960 Squaw Valley Olympics with the return of bobsleigh and luge after the sports had been skipped due to the lack of facilities for them in Squaw Valley. Unlike the preceding Games, a demonstration sport, ice stock sport, was incorporated into the 1964 Olympic program. This was the second and most recent occasion on which this sport (a German variant of curling), had been played as a demonstration sport at the Winter Olympics; the first appearance was at the 1936 Winter Olympics. Both men and women participated in the 1964 Games, with twelve women's events incorporated into the program.

The Soviet Union won the most medals; its athletes collected a total of 25, 11 of which were gold. Norway placed second, with 15 medals, and host nation Austria placed third, with 12 medals. Of the 36 competing NOCs, 14 won at least one medal, with 11 of these winning at least one gold. The 1964 Games were marred by the deaths of two competitors during training – the British luge competitor Kazimierz Kay-Skrzypeski and the Australian alpine skier Ross Milne.

The Scandinavian nations Sweden, Norway and Finland, as well as the Soviet Union, repeated their dominance of the 1960 cross-country skiing medal tally in 1964 – together, they won all of the medals attainable for this sport. Similarly, Germany had great success at the luge competition, with the United Team of Germany winning five of the available nine medals. Two participants representing Great Britain placed first in the two-man bobsleigh event, earning that nation its first Winter Olympics gold medal in 12 years. Lidiya Skoblikova, a speed skater representing the Soviet Union, earned the most medals at the 1964 Games, winning gold in all four of the women's events in her sport. This achievement made Skoblikova the first Winter Olympian to win four individual gold medals in one edition of the Games.

Alpine skiing

Biathlon

Bobsleigh

Cross-country skiing

Figure skating

Ice hockey

Luge

Nordic combined

Ski jumping

Speed skating

Multiple medalists
Athletes who won multiple medals during the 1964 Winter Olympics are listed below.

Notes
 No bronze medal was awarded in this event because three competitors tied for second place with a time of 40.6 seconds.
 No bronze medal was awarded in this event because Skoblikova and Han tied for second with a time of 5 minutes 18.5 seconds.

See also
1964 Winter Olympics medal table

References

External links

Lists of Winter Olympic medalists by year
Medal winners
Austria sport-related lists